Taush (Tıwış) is a rural locality (a village) in Kirillovsky Selsoviet, Ufimsky District, Bashkortostan, Russia. The population was 55 as of 2010. It has 1 street.

Geography 
Taush is located 30 km northeast of Ufa (the district's administrative centre) by road. Gribovka is the nearest rural locality.

References 

Rural localities in Ufimsky District